The 2015 Las Vegas Challenger was a professional tennis tournament played on hard courts. It was the first edition of the revamped tournament which was part of the 2015 ATP Challenger Tour. Challenger level events had ended in Las Vegas in the year 2000. It took place in Las Vegas, United States between 19 and 25 October 2015.

Singles main draw entrants

Seeds

 1 Rankings are as of October 12, 2015.

Other entrants
The following players received wildcards into the singles main draw:
  Jakob Amilon
  Ace Matias
  Michael Mmoh
  Evan Song

The following player received entry into the singles main draw as a special exempt:
  Taylor Fritz
 
The following players received entry from the qualifying draw:
  Henri Laaksonen 
  Dennis Nevolo
  Eric Quigley
  Eduardo Struvay

Champions

Singles

  Thiemo de Bakker def.  Grega Žemlja, 3–6, 6–3, 6–1

Doubles

  Carsten Ball /  Dustin Brown def.  Dean O'Brien /  Ruan Roelofse, 3–6, 6–3, [10–6]

External links

Las Vegas Challenger
Tennis Channel Open
Tennis in Las Vegas
2015 in American tennis
Las Vegas Challenger
2015 in sports in Nevada